The Biannulariaceae are a family of fungi in the order Agaricales. The family contains three genera. All species form agaricoid basidiocarps (gilled mushrooms). The family was originally described to accommodate the single genus Catathelasma, but has been extended as a result of DNA research.

References

Agaricales
Agaricales families